Daniel Baldy (born 25 September 1994) is a German teacher and politician of the Social Democratic Party (SPD) who has been a Member of the German Bundestag for Mainz in Rhineland-Palatinate since 2021.

Political career
In parliament, Baldy has been serving on the Committee on Family Affairs, Senior Citizens, Women and Youth.

Other activities
 Education and Science Workers' Union (GEW), Member
 IG Bergbau, Chemie, Energie, Member

References

See also 

 List of members of the 20th Bundestag

1994 births
Living people
21st-century German politicians
Members of the Bundestag for Rhineland-Palatinate
People from Mainz
Members of the Bundestag for the Social Democratic Party of Germany